Christopher Stephen Beech (born 16 September 1974) is an English former professional footballer, manager and coach who was most recently the head coach of Carlisle United.

Playing career
Beech began his career at his hometown club Blackpool at 16 years of age, leaving Fleetwood High School in 1990. "I was 18 when I made my first-team debut against Port Vale at home," he recalled to the Chorley Guardian in 2006. "I then signed a two-year contract under Billy (Ayre)."  Sam Allarydce succeeded Ayre as manager in 1994, making Beech an integral part of his promotion chasing playing squad either as a central midfield player or utilising him in the sweeper role, the team narrowly missed out on automatic promotion by three points and lost to Bradford in the playoffs, subsequently both Allardyce and Beech left at the end of the 1995/96 season, Beech moved to Hartlepool United (1996/97) where he gained a growing reputation as a goal scoring midfield player through making late runs into the box, this attracted the attention of Championship side, Huddersfield Town, who went to tribunal in 1998/99 season to secure his services, Beech became an established member of Steve Bruce's Premiership-chasing side in 1999/2000.

Following an Achilles operation in 2000/2001 Beech struggled to regain full fitness and eventually left Huddersfield to join Rochdale in 2001/2002 season under Paul Simpson, struggling to fully recover from the Achilles injury Beech eventually retired from playing in 2004 and made the full time transition into coaching.

Coaching career 
BURY FOOTBALL CLUB (League Two)

Beech completed his UEFA A License in 2005 whilst fast establishing his reputation for player development with Bury FC supporting then Head of Youth Chris Casper.  Casper moved up to become Bury FC's first team manager and Beech inherited responsibility for Bury's Centre of Excellence, Youth and Reserve sides with a mandate to establish pathways to the first team for their younger players. Beech's impact in youth football was immediate, transforming Bury's youth team into Youth Alliance League and cup winners developing now professional players such as David Worrall and Dale Stephens .

ROCHDALE FOOTBALL CLUB (League One)

Beech was offered the opportunity to become Head of youth coaching at Rochdale Football Club following Keith Hill's appointment from youth team manager to first team manager in 2007/2008 also consuming responsibility for the reserve side and centre of excellence.

This was to become the start of a 12 year relationship that would see Beech replicate and succeed the success he had at Bury's youth system at Rochdale, with a reputation for establishing quick talented footballers a stream of which came through the clubs youth system and either established themselves in the first team or were transferred for substantial fees, current professional players such as Will Buckley, Scott Hogan, Jamie Allen, Callum Camps and Andy Cannon formed part of this programme.

Beech spent time with SC Braga in Portugal in 2009 to complete his Academy Managers course which help shape his philosophy on football player development and he went on to complete his UEFA Pro License in 2010 with the visit of fellow candidate Gianfranco Zola to Rochdale to complete the FA assessment criteria enhancing his industry reputation as a forward thinking coach.

In December 2011, Beech was appointed caretaker manager at Rochdale for a month, following Steve Eyre's dismissal. Rochdale lost three and drew three of the six games in which he took charge before John Coleman was installed as the permanent manager on 24 January 2012. Beech returned to his role as youth team manager following the appointment.

Keith Hill returned to Rochdale as manager in January 2013 replacing John Coleman, and confirmed Beech was to be his new assistant manager.  This was to be the start of arguably the most successful period in the football clubs history, spanning six seasons  through to March 2019, winning promotion to EFL League One at the first time of asking in 2014 and achieving consecutive top ten finishes on minimal finance and several successful FA Cup runs, with a highlight reaching the 5th round and taking Premiership Tottenham Hotspur in February 2018 to a replay at Wembley, then managed by Mauricio Pochettino.

Beech left Rochdale along with Hill in March 2019 after a poor run of form 

CARLISLE UNITED (League Two)

Chris Beech was appointed Carlisle United Manager on 26 November 2019 with an inherited side 5 points off the bottom of League 2 and 21st in the league table.

Beech immediately improved performances and results, securing an FA Cup run, taking Championship side Cardiff to a replay.  Beech averaged a 1.6 points per game ratio with Carlisle and managed to operate shrewdly in the January transfer window recruiting Elliot Watt from Wolves, Nick Anderton and Callum Guy from Blackpool, Omari Patrick from Bradford and Joshua Kayode from Rotherham, however his first season at Carlisle  was cut short with Carlisle United in 18th place in the League 2 table after the 2019–2020 season was suspended and subsequently ended with immediate effect due to the COVID Pandemic in 2020 with the final league table being defined by a points-per-game basis.

Football initially resumed for the 2020-2021 season and Beech was forced to recruit a new look squad, following a slow start to the season, Beech's side hit form and consecutive league wins carried them to the top of League 2 by January 2021, Beech's Carlisle side were playing fast attacking counter pressing football, breaking in game statistics and as a consequence gaining the side huge plaudits within the national media.

Beech himself was fast gathering a reputation as a coach of substance and was linked with a number of jobs further up the footballing pyramid, to thwart this interest Carlisle rewarded Beech, and his assistant Gavin Skelton with new 2 year contracts, announced on the clubs social media on Christmas Day 2020.

The COVID Pandemic was still in situ and footballing games were being played frequently behind closed doors, in January 2021, 19 of the Carlisle first team squad tested positive for the virus forcing the EFL to suspend their involvement and the football club temporarily shut down, once Carlisle were able to resume their campaign, bad weather hit the north of England, with Carlisle finding it difficult to get games on or secure training facilities given most commercial venues were shut down due to national lock down and other sporting clubs did not want to share their own venue and risk cross contamination and jeopardise their own season..

At one stage Carlisle found themselves 9 games behind other teams, ultimately having to complete 25 games in a 12 week period which took its toll on the squad and initial results suffered post COVID shut down.  Cambridge United manager Mark Bonner pre match stated "Carlisle have been chopped down at the knees with the virus".   Form did eventually pick up losing only once, to Bolton Wanderers in the last 11 games, however this wasn't enough and the side finished 10th on 66 points.

The 2021-2022 season began with much optimism, however Carlisle failed to retain key players and the club elected to sell  playing assets as the season began with defenders Aaron Hayden joining Wrexham (undisclosed fee) and George Tanner joined Championship side Bristol City (undisclosed fee) just as the transfer window closed.

Supporters began to become disgruntled and frustrated at the lack of investment, lack of ambition and voiced their concerns towards the board of directors.  Beech's revised side had an indifferent start to the 2021-2022 season, drawing to Colchester and Port Vale, beating Swindon, Salford but consecutive league defeats to Sutton United, Forest Green and Bristol Rovers saw Beech lose his job on 10 October 2021.

Notes

References
Beech's profile at Soccerbase

External links
"Make my Day": Chris Beech - Chorley Guardian

1974 births
Living people
English footballers
Blackpool F.C. players
Hartlepool United F.C. players
Huddersfield Town A.F.C. players
Rochdale A.F.C. players
Sportspeople from Blackpool
Rochdale A.F.C. non-playing staff
Carlisle United F.C. managers
Association football midfielders
English football managers
English Football League managers